The Hanriot H.43 was a military utility aircraft produced in France in the late 1920s and early 1930s which was primarily used by the Aéronautique Militaire as a trainer. While Hanriot had spent most of the 1920s manufacturing further and further developments of the HD.14 that had flown in 1920, the H.43 was an entirely new design. It was a conventional single-bay biplane with staggered wings of unequal span and a fuselage of fabric-covered metal tube. Accommodation for the pilot and passenger was in tandem, open cockpits and the main units of the fixed, tailskid undercarriage were linked by a cross-axle.

Design and Development
Two prototypes in 1927 were followed by the LH.431 in 1928, a much-modified version that dispensed with the sweepback used on both the upper and lower wings of the H.43, had a new tail fin and added metal covering to the sides of the fuselage. This was ordered into production by the Aéronautique Militaire, which ordered 50 examples. These were slightly different again from the LH.431 prototype, having divided main undercarriage units, wings of slightly greater area, and redesigned interplane struts.

Operational history
From 1927 to 1933, the Army would purchase  nearly 150 examples for a variety of support roles including training, liaison, observation, and as an air ambulance. At the Fall of France in 1940, 75 of these aircraft remained in service.

H.43 variants were also operated by civil flying schools in France, as well as 12 examples purchased for the military of Peru

Variants

 H.43 – prototype with Salmson CM.9 engine (2 built)
 H.430 – version with Salmson 9Ab engine (1 under construction but never completed)
 H.431.01 – development of H.430 with revised wings, fin, and fuselage and Lorraine 7Ma engine (1 built)
 LH.431 – production version with divided main undercarriage units and Lorraine 7Mc engine (62 built)
 LH.432 – gunnery training version with machine gun on ring mount in rear cockpit (1 built, plus 1 converted from LH.431)
 LH.433 – revised LH.431 with modified landing gear and tail fin, and Lorraine 7Me engine (26 built)
 LH.434 – (1 built)
 H.436 – dedicated trainer version based on LH.433 with Salmson 9Ab engine (50 built)
 LH.437 – air ambulance version based on LH.433 (1 built, plus one converted from LH.431)
 LH.437ter – air ambulance version with Salmson engine (1 converted from LH.437. Subsequently converted back and redesignated H.437/1).
 H.438 – export version of LH.433 for Peru (12 built)
 H.439 – civil trainer version, some with tailwheel in place of tailskid (13 converted from LH.431).

Operators

French Air Force

Peruvian Air Force

Spanish Republican Air Force, Hanriot LH.437/239

Specifications (H.431)

See also

References

Further reading
 
 

1920s French military utility aircraft
H.043
Biplanes